Jean-Pierre Van Zyl (born 15 August 1975) is a South African track cyclist. He won medals in the UCI Track Cycling World Championships - a silver medal in keirin in 1997 and a bronze medal in scratch in 2003.

Career achievements

References 

 

1975 births
Living people
South African track cyclists
South African male cyclists
People from Potchefstroom
Cyclists at the 1996 Summer Olympics
Olympic cyclists of South Africa